"Fire in the Sky" is a song recorded by American country music group Nitty Gritty Dirt Band. The song was first released in 1981 and peaked at number 76 on the Billboard Hot 100. In November 1986, the song was released to the country music format, peaking at number 7 on the Hot Country Songs charts and number five on the Canadian country charts.  The song features a guest vocal by Kenny Loggins, along with saxophones played by Bryan Savage and Al Garth.  This song was written by group members Jeff Hanna and Bob Carpenter.

Chart performance

References

1981 singles
1986 singles
1981 songs
Nitty Gritty Dirt Band songs
Warner Records singles
Songs written by Jeff Hanna